Erez Zadok (in Hebrew: ארז צדוק) is an Israeli comic book writer, born 1980 in Netanya, known especially for his graphic novel "Tranquilo" (טרנקילו).

Biography 
In 1998 Zadok finished high-school, and published some short comic book stories. His most famous comic book stories from those years was "Max" (מקס) and "Zoo-La" (Zoo-לה), that were very successful and were published in various youth magazines.

In his adult life, he studied visual arts at the Bezalel Academy of Arts and Design. He finished his studies there in 2014, and as his final project he published the book Tranquilo. The book tells about his trip after the army in South America, and was also a great success. Nissim Hezekiah pointed at the book as one of the five best Israeli comics.
Apart from the paper, Zadok publishes his comic stories on Instagram and currently (as of 2020) his Instagram page has almost 10,000 followers.

In 2015 he collaborated with the author Liat Rotner and together the two created the successful comic book for teenagers "Miko Bell: The Potions Boy".

In 2019 Zadok published an illustrated Passover haggadah written by Jordan B. Gorfinkel.

He is married to Lina, and they have a daughter named Mai.

References

External links 

 Erez Zadok on Facebook
 Erez Zadok on Instegram
 An interview with Zadok, on the news site "nrg"
 An interview with Zadok, on the news site "Mako"

1980 births
People from Netanya
Living people
Israeli comics writers